Balaklava High School is a country high school of around 300 students ranging from years 8 to 12. The school has around 30 teachers. It is located in Balaklava, in the Adelaide Plains in South Australia, Australia.

The school has a strong emphasis on Vocational Education and Industry and training partnership programs such as VET, Agriculture, Performing Arts, and an Engineering Pathways programs.

Facilities
Balaklava High School has facilities for its students to use, including:

References

External links
Official school website

High schools in South Australia